Daniel Koat Mathews (born 1937) is a Sudanese politician and Nuer leader, who has been effectively involved in the national politics for many years. He is now a major general in the Sudan People's Liberation Army.

Biography
Engineer Daniel Koat Mathews was born in the Upper Nile state county known as Kuanylualthoan or Nasir. He speaks Arabic, English, Ethiopian, Swedish and his native Nuer language.

Political career
Daniel Mathews was appointed Governor of the Upper Nile Region. In 1983, the Regional Government of Southern Sudan was divided into three regions. These were Bahr Elgazal Region, Equatoria Region and the Upper Nile Region. Mathews was the governor of the Upper Nile Region for a number of years before he left that position, after the government of Gaafar Nimeiry failed to survive the national turmoil created by the war in the South and the uprising in the North.

In 1983 when the war broke out in Bor town, Dr. Garang went to Ethiopia. He was followed by many other Southern Sudan Commanders. In Ethiopia there was a split between the Southern Sudanese forces. Dr. Garang and other politicians embraced the idea of liberating the whole Sudan from the Arab rulers while other Southern Sudanese like Samuel Gai Tut and Akuot Atem insisted on the idea of simply liberating the South and making it an independent country from the North. This split led to a bloodshed which resulted in the death of both Samuel Gai Tut and Akuot Atem. After that incident, the former Anyanya 1 began to call itself Anyanya 2. That was not the name it was referred to by the SPLA soldiers. Under Gordon Koang and Duol Chol The Anyanya 2 created a link to the government in Khartoum. Between 1984 and 1986, a bloody war maintained its ugly presence and resulted in the death of many SPLA soldiers and civilians. In 1987 Daniel Mathews decided to introduce reconciliation between the SPLA and Anyanya 1. His efforts succeeded and resulted in the merging of two military organizations until 1991, when Dr. Riek Machar and Dr. Lam Akol decided to stage a coup and remove Dr. Garang. Mr. Daniel Koat Mathews is still known by countless Sudanese for this historic act of making reconciliation a success at the time it was badly needed in Southern Sudan. This merging led to military victories for SPLA. Nasir was captured and SPLA remained strong for sometime.

General Daniel K. Mathews later joined the government of Southern Sudan, and currently serves as a major general in the Sudan People's Liberation Army. Southern Sudan is expected to vote for either a United Sudan or an independent Southern Sudan along the Nile River. The Comprehensive Peace Agreement was signed in Kenya with the help of IGAD and The International Community. In order to ensure the implementation of this CPA, the government of South Sudan officials continue to do their part until a lasting solution is reached.

References

External links 
 article
 US Visit
 Nasir Coummunity Association

1937 births
Living people
Sudan People's Liberation Movement politicians
Sudanese military personnel
People from Upper Nile (state)